The 1962 Davidson Wildcats football team represented Davidson College as a member of the Southern Conference (SoCon) during the 1962 NCAA University Division football season. Led by 11th-year head coach Bill Dole, the Wildcats compiled an overall record of 3–5–1 with a mark of 0–4–1 in conference play, placing last out of ninth teams in the SoCon..

Schedule

References

Davidson
Davidson Wildcats football seasons
Davidson Wildcats football